Meaney is a surname. Notable people with the surname include:

 Aislinn Meaney (born 1998), Irish association footballer
 Audrey Meaney (1931–2021), English archaeologist and historian
 Colm Meaney (born 1953), Irish actor
 Con Meaney (1890–1970), Irish politician and farmer
 Denis Meaney (1936–2011), Australian rugby league player
 Kevin Meaney (1956–2016), American comedian and actor
 Kevin Meaney (Gaelic footballer), Irish football player
 John Meaney (born 1957), British science fiction author
 John Meaney (footballer) (born 1919), English footballer
 Liam Meaney (born 1972), Irish hurler
 Michael Meaney (born 1951), Canadian professor specializing in biological psychiatry, neurology, and neurosurgery
 Michael Meaney (darts player) (born 1989), Irish darts player
 Nick Meaney (born 1997), Australian rugby league player
 Patrick Meaney, American film director, screenwriter, producer, comic book writer, and editor
 Sean Meaney (born 1986), rugby player
 Thomas Meaney (1931–2022), Irish politician and farmer
 Thomas Francis Meaney (1888–1968), American judge

See also
Mooney
Meanie (disambiguation)
Meany (disambiguation)